Xamaro is a district of Somali Region in Ethiopia.

See also 

 Districts of Ethiopia

References 

Districts of Somali Region